Nangal Sahdan ننگل ساہداں is a town in suburb of Muridke in Sheikhupura District.

Populated places in Sheikhupura District